Lala Sehrai, (Urdu: لالہ صحرائی) (2000-1920) was an Urdu poet and writer from Pakistan.

Biography

Education
Sehrai's writings were also published in magazines and newspapers of the country. He had special relationships and contact with well-known people. Due to his efforts, there was held an All-Pakistan Mushaira in Jehanian in 1962, in which the leading poets across the country participated. He was always presented in social services of the city of Jehanian. In recognition of his services for the city, a square has also been named as Lala Sehrai Chowk.

References

1920 births
2000 deaths
20th-century Pakistani poets
Urdu-language poets from Pakistan
Punjabi-language poets
20th-century Pakistani male writers